Phreatoasellus is a genus of isopod crustaceans in the family Asellidae. It contains the following species:
 Phreatoasellus akyioshiensis (Ueno, 1927)
 Phreatoasellus higoensis (Matsumoto, 1960)
 Phreatoasellus iriei (Matsumoto, 1978)
 Phreatoasellus joianus (Henry & Magniez, 1991)
 Phreatoasellus kawamurai (Tattersall, 1921)
 Phreatoasellus minatoi (Matsumoto, 1978)
 Phreatoasellus uenoi (Matsumoto, 1978)
 Phreatoasellus yoshinoensis (Matsumoto, 1960)

References

Asellota